Bepicolombo may refer to:
 BepiColombo, a mission to Mercury launched in October 2018
 10387 Bepicolombo, an asteroid

See also 
 Giuseppe "Bepi" Colombo, an Italian scientist and engineer (1920-1984)